Pontelatone is a comune (municipality) in the Province of Caserta in the Italian region Campania, located about  north of Naples and about  northwest of Caserta.   The località Treglia (also spelled Tregghia), within the  Pontelatone communal territory, is the site of ancient city of Trebula.

Pontelatone borders the following municipalities: Bellona, Camigliano, Capua, Castel di Sasso, Formicola, Liberi, Roccaromana.

References

Cities and towns in Campania